The following types of boats and ships are native to the Philippines

 Balangay
 Paraw
 Vinta
 Karakoa

See also 
 List of boat types
 Lists of watercraft types

Boats and ships